Seethyalla Savitri (aka Seethe Alla Savithri) is a 1973 Indian Kannada family film directed by Jawahar and P. Vadiraj starring Vishnuvardhan.  The film was produced by renowned comedian and reputed Kannada producer P. Vadiraj through his production company Vijaya Bharathi.

Plot

Cast
 Vishnuvardhan as Shankara
 Ambareesh
 Jayalakshmi
 Udaya Chandrika
 Balakrishna
 Shringar Nagaraj
 H. R. Shastry
 M. N. Lakshmi Devi
 Kalavathi
 Advani Lakshmi Devi

Soundtrack
 "Dum Dum Baarisu Nagaari"
 "Thaarunya Thandide Bhaara" - singer: S. Janaki
 "Samaagama Manorama" - singer: P. B. Sreenivas, lyrics: R. N. Jayagopal
 "Balleya Iniya Balleya"
 "Devi Aatagaathiyu Neenu" - singer: P. B. Sreenivas, S. Janaki, lyrics: R. N. Jayagopal

References

1973 films
1970s Kannada-language films
Films scored by Vijaya Bhaskar
Films about cattle